Ernesto A. Medina is a plant ecologist specializing in plant physiology when adapting to the changing environment. He is an elected international member of the National Academy of Sciences, and is adjunct professor in the department of Center for Applied Tropical Ecology and Conservation (CREST-CATEC).

Early life and education 
Ernesto A. Medina was born in Venezuela. After receiving his undergraduate degree in biology at the Universidad Central de Venezuela, he went to Stuttgart, Germany where he completed a doctorate (PhD) in agronomy. During that time, he published studies of his doctorate work focusing on the plant's physical development. This was the foundation for his investigation in plants which he continues researching later in his life.

Career and research 
He was assistant professor at the Universidad Central in Caracas, and joined the department of Ecology at the Venezuela Institute for scientific Research (IVIC) in 1970. 

Since 2013, he held a position as adjunct professor in the department of Center for Applied Tropical Ecology and Conservation (CREST-CATEC) where he continued his research on plant physiology.

Fields 
Medina focuses on the study of plant populations and their environmental variables, particularly nutrient availability in natural ecosystems.  His research includes the study of how a changing environment can affect photosynthesis, respiration, and nutrient uptake during various plant developmental stages. He studies how the plant community is affected by industrial pollution, change in land use caused by agriculture, pasture, lumbering and fire management, and he applies his findings in the area of global change research. His current research focuses on plant productivity responses to salinity, drought, and nutrient availability in coastal wetlands.

Awards and honors 
He holds an honorary membership in the Ecological Society of America supported by letters from P. D. Coley, T. A. as well as the international membership in the National Academy of Sciences.

His honors also include Guggenheim fellow and Lorenzo Mendoza Fleury Prize.

Publications 
He has written and published many works in different languages including English, German and Spanish. Here provided three of his most important works:

 Merwe, N., & Medina, E. (1991). The canopy effect, carbon isotope ratios and foodwebs in amazonia. Journal Of Archaeological Science, 249-259.

 Cuevas, E., & Medina, E. (1988). Nutrient dynamics within Amazonian forests. Oecologia, 76(2), 222-235.

 Bullock, S. (1995). Seasonally dry tropical forests. Cambridge: University Press.

Public engagement 
In 1970, he did postdoctoral research at the Carnegie Institution (Stanford, California) on the photosynthesis of plants. 

In 1979, Medina was a guest at both the Australian National University and Stanford University (USA).  

Medina has also participated projects with MAB, INTECOL, SCOPE, OAS, and FAO.  He has helped establish a school of plant ecology in Venezuela by training 27 students through IVIC and the Universidad Central de Venezuela.

References

External links 

Living people
Year of birth missing (living people)